Arthrobacter silviterrae is a Gram-positive bacterium from the genus Arthrobacter which has been isolated from forest soil from Ongjin, Korea.

References 

Micrococcaceae
Bacteria described in 2017